Ben Matthews (born 21 July 1963 in England) is the guitarist and keyboard player with the hard rock band Thunder. He is also an experienced studio engineer and mixer; he worked with progressive rock act Mostly Autumn as studio engineer on their 2005 album Storms Over Still Water. He also guested on their 2006 live album Storms Over London Town. He uses mainly Gibson and Fender guitars with Marshall amplification.

Equipment

Guitars
Ben uses the following unmodified guitars
 Gibson Les Paul Custom
 Gibson Les Paul Gold Top
 Gibson Les Paul Custom Shop Reissue
 Fender Telecaster

References

1963 births
Living people
English rock guitarists
English male guitarists
English audio engineers
Thunder (band) members